Drew Holland (born 11 April 1995) is an American water polo player. He competed in the 2020 Summer Olympics. He played college water polo at Stanford University.

References

External links
 Stanford Cardinal bio

1995 births
Living people
Sportspeople from Berkeley, California
Water polo players at the 2020 Summer Olympics
American male water polo players
Olympic water polo players of the United States
Stanford Cardinal men's water polo players